The Supercopa MX was a Mexican football competition contested by the winners of the Apertura and Clausura Copa MX, initially in a two-legged and later a single final. It was launched in 2014 and lasted until 2019.

History
In June 2013 Liga MX president Decio De María announced the winners of Apertura and Clausura Copa MX will face each other and the winner will qualify to the following year's Copa Libertadores as "Mexico 3".

On June 20, 2014 it was announced the two teams would face each other in a two-legged home-and-away series called SuperCopa MX.

The 2015 edition SuperCopa MX was a single match at a neutral venue, Toyota Stadium in Frisco, Texas, United States, making Mexico the fourth nation (after Italy, France and Turkey) and first North American nation to stage its Super Cup abroad.

On May 20, 2019, it was announced that the Copa MX would be held once a year (July–April), and thus the status of the match is unknown.

List of finals

Titles by club

See also
Campeón de Campeones
Copa MX

References

 
Football competitions in Mexico
National association football supercups
Recurring sporting events established in 2014
2014 establishments in Mexico